Bucculatrix firmianella is a moth in the family Bucculatricidae. It was described by Hiroshi Kuroko in 1982. It is found in Japan (Honshu, Shikoku, Kyushu). 

The forewings are white, mixed with yellowish brown. Adults are on wing from May to October.

The larvae feed on Firmiana simplex. They mine the leaves of their host plant. The mine has the form of a spiral linear mine. Larvae can be found from May to October.

References

Natural History Museum Lepidoptera generic names catalog

Bucculatricidae
Moths described in 1982
Moths of Japan